Maya "May" Millete (born May 1, 1981) is a Filipino American woman who disappeared on January 7, 2021, in Chula Vista, California. A police investigation into her disappearance is ongoing.

Biography of Maya
Maya Millete, a Filipino American, was a civilian employee of the United States Navy; she last worked as a contract specialist for the Naval Information Warfare Center. Millete was born in the Philippines but raised in Honolulu. She graduated from Admiral Arthur W. Radford High School, later attending and graduating from University of Hawaiʻi at Mānoa. Maya met Larry Millete in high school, after he had moved to Hawaii from San Diego with his family following a juvenile gang related assault arrest in 1997. They later married and he served in the United States Navy for five years. They moved to San Diego, and had three children. In late 2020 their relationship deteriorated and Larry allegedly became increasingly controlling and paranoid as he discovered Maya was having an affair. By December 2020, Maya had resolved to divorce Larry and was taking steps to formalize the separation  A friend of Maya's alleged that Larry had physically abused her, and that she feared for the safety of their children. Another friend had offered a condo safe house to her because of fears for her safety.

Disappearance and searches
On January 7, 2021, Millete was last seen at the family's house around 5 in the evening; she had called a divorce attorney earlier that day. The following day, Larry Millete was observed on video backing their black Lexus GX 460 into a position where the rear of the vehicle could not be seen on camera. Larry claimed that he drove the Lexus to Solana Beach with one of their children that day; the vehicle was later impounded by the Chula Vista Police Department. Maya's relatives came to check on her on January 8 but were told by Larry that she had remained locked in a room by herself since the previous day. When they returned the following morning and insisted Larry open the door, they found the room empty with no sign of her. Millete's sister, Maricris Drouaillet, then filed a missing persons report with the Chula Vista Police Department. Millete is presumed to be dead.

On January 13, 2021, volunteers searched Mount San Miguel Park for Millete. On January 23, 2021, investigators conducted a search warrant at Millete's home, searching for clues or any evidence that would point to the cause of her disappearance or possible whereabouts. In January, Maya's relatives hired a private investigator to assist in finding her.  On February 5, 2021, the Chula Vista Police Department and Millete's family held a briefing to encourage the public to look for her. Skeletal remains were found in Orange County that were thought to be Millete's remains, but this was proven false, and the remains were then said to be that of a male. Later on the remains were proven to be animal bones.

Additional searches for Maya Millete were conducted by volunteers in February at the Glamis sand dunes, March near Lower Otay Lake, and May in National City and at an abandoned golf course in Chula Vista. In late July, at an event celebrating Filipino-American Friendship Day, an effort was made to increase awareness of the continued search for Maya. In late October, searches were conducted near the Salton Sea, Fish Creek, and Glamis. Up until his arrest in late October, Larry Millete had not participated in any of the searches. In early November, searchers returned to Glamis sand dunes; the area of Imperial Gables was also searched in November. Searches for Maya continue to occur weekly through December. On 8 January 2022, a prayer vigil was held commemorating a year of Maya Millete being missing, and searches continued in January including the use of ground penetrating drones. Searches for Maya continued into 2022, with searches occurring at least in August, and September.

Audio recording
Eight loud bangs can be heard in an audio recording from January 7, 2021, at approximately 8:30pm in the vicinity of Millete's Chula Vista residence. The audio recording, which was released to law enforcement and the public, corresponds to video surveillance footage that was not released to the public due to privacy concerns brought by the neighbor who provided the video footage and audio recording.

National media attention
On April 6, 2021, Maya's disappearance was aired on Good Morning America. The attorney for Millete's family, her sister, and her brother-in-law appeared on Dr. Phil on April 12, 2021. In an article by Dateline NBC, the case of Maya's disappearance was included among 169 other missing individuals.
On February 19, 2022, more than a year since Millete's disappearance, CBS network’s true-crime series 48 Hours aired an hour-long report on her case, hoping the national exposure can lead to some answers.

Prosecution of Larry Millete
In an interview in January 2021, Larry admitted to having arguments with Maya in 2020. Beginning on February 3, 2021, Larry hired an attorney and stopped being cooperative with police. In April 2021, it was reported that Larry wanted to hire someone to kill the man he suspected Maya had an affair with. In May 2021, Larry's remaining firearms were seized by the police based on a gun violence restraining order (GRVO) due to the unsafe environment they posed to his children; his children reportedly knew the passcode to his gun safe and a photo was presented showing his 4-year-old son standing on a table, surrounded by firearms.

In May 2021, Maya's parents requested visitations with the children; Larry refused and did not respond to any further communications with her parents. By July, Maya's parents had filed a formal petition for visitation rights and a hearing was set for December 2021. In late July 2021, Larry was named a person of interest by the Chula Vista Police Department. In September 2021, with visitation of the children still in dispute, Larry made accusations against members of Maya's side of the family, in an attempt to justify the lack of visitation. On Tuesday October 19, 2021, Larry Millete was arrested and charged with the murder of his wife Maya. During a press conference announcing the arrest San Diego County District Attorney Summer Stephan stated that the body of Maya Millete had not yet been found as of the time of the arrest. The arrest came after 67 search warrants had been executed, and 87 interviews had been conducted. After Larry's arrest, he remained in custody and was held without bond. As a result, the couple's children were passed to their paternal grandparents' custody. On Thursday October 21, 2021, Larry pleaded not guilty at his arraignment at San Diego County Superior Court's South County Court in Chula Vista. As part of his arraignment, he was prohibited from contacting his children to prevent further emotional trauma.

On Wednesday October 27, Superior Court Judge Maryann D’Addezio ruled that Larry violated the restraining order prohibiting him from contacting his children by speaking with them during phone calls he made to his parents from jail. In total, he made over a hundred phone calls and spoke with his children for more than nine hours during which he asked them to read him newspaper articles about his upcoming trial. As a result, Larry was limited to only calling his attorney. On Thursday November 4, Larry was denied bail and release, with the judge citing his past threat of harm upon an individual he believes was having an affair with Maya. That same day, Maya's sister submitted a motion to gain custody of the children and move them to Moreno Valley, California. On Wednesday 10 November, Judge Julia Craig Kelety granted Maya's sister visitation rights, but allowed the paternal grandparents to retain custody so the children can continue to attend their current schools in Chula Vista. The children also received a court appointed guardian. By early December 2021, both Maya's sister and the paternal grandparents had both filed for guardianship of the children. In mid January 2022, maternal family visitation rights were modified, to allow for the children to travel up to Riverside County every other weekend, while extending paternal grandparent custody until at least April 2022.

Following a petition in June 2022 by Larry's defense attorney that he was not competent to stand trial, Larry was examined by a psychiatrist, and San Diego County Superior Court Judge Cindy Davis subsequently ruled in September 2022 that Larry was mentally competent to stand trail.  In October 2022, Larry was granted permission to communicate with his children by writing, but was still forbidden from communicating with his children through in-person visitation and telephone.

See also
List of people who disappeared

Notes

References

2020s missing person cases
2021 in California
Female United States Navy civilians
Filipino emigrants to the United States
History of women in California
Incidents of violence against women
Missing person cases in California
People from Chula Vista, California
University of Hawaiʻi at Mānoa alumni